Limestone is a census-designated place (CDP) in Rogers County, Oklahoma, United States, at an elevation of 705 feet.  It is located less than 10 miles west of Claremore, Oklahoma on Oklahoma State Highway 20.  The population was 753 as of July 2020.

Geography
Limestone is located at  (36.311296, -95.755040).

Demographics

As of the census of 2000, there were 745 people, 252 households, and 214 families residing in the CDP. The population density was 236.1 people per square mile (91.3/km2). There were 258 housing units at an average density of 81.8/sq mi (31.6/km2). The racial makeup of the CDP was 85.23% White, 4.97% Native American, 0.54% Asian, 1.07% from other races, and 8.19% from two or more races. Hispanic or Latino of any race were 1.34% of the population.

There were 252 households, out of which 40.5% had children under the age of 18 living with them, 76.2% were married couples living together, 6.0% had a female householder with no husband present, and 14.7% were non-families. 11.5% of all households were made up of individuals, and 3.6% had someone living alone who was 65 years of age or older. The average household size was 2.96 and the average family size was 3.22.

In the CDP, the population was spread out, with 28.6% under the age of 18, 5.8% from 18 to 24, 28.5% from 25 to 44, 28.3% from 45 to 64, and 8.9% who were 65 years of age or older. The median age was 38 years. For every 100 females, there were 103.6 males. For every 100 females age 18 and over, there were 101.5 males.

The median income for a household in the CDP was $51,750, and the median income for a family was $56,625. Males had a median income of $56,042 versus $30,089 for females. The per capita income for the CDP was $21,035. About 8.8% of families and 5.2% of the population were below the poverty line, including none of those under age 18 and 39.4% of those age 65 or over.

References

Census-designated places in Rogers County, Oklahoma
Census-designated places in Oklahoma